Acteocina infrequens, common name the Magdalena barrel bubble, is a species of small sea snail, a marine opisthobranch gastropod mollusk in the family Acteocinidae, the barrel bubble snails.

Description
The length of the shell attains 6.7 mm, its diameter 2.5 mm.

The small, slender shell has a subcylindric shape. It is translucent white and is polished. The shell contains four whorls. The protoconch is minute, subglobular and transparent. The suture is distinct, more or less channeled. The spire is short but distinctly turreted. The aperture is narrow. The outer lip is straight, rounding below into the thickened columella which has a strong plait with a groove behind it. The body has a slight glaze.

Distribution
This marine species occurs in Magdalena Bay, Lower California; off Baja California to Pacific Panama.

References

 Keen, A. M. 1971. Sea Shells of Tropical West America. Marine mollusks from Baja California to Peru, ed. 2. Stanford University Press. xv, 1064 pp., 22 pls.
 Jordan, Eric. The Pleistonence Fauna of Magdalena Bay, Lower California. Stanford University Press, 1936.
 Angulo-Campillo, Orso. "A four year survey of the opisthobranch fauna (Gastropoda, Opisthobranchia) from Baja California Sur, Mexico." Vita Malacologia 3 (2005): 43-50 (cited as Acteocina magdalensis).

External links
  Valdés, Ángel, and Yolanda E. Camacho-García. "" Cephalaspidean" Heterobranchs (Gastropoda) from the Pacific Coast of Costa Rica." PROCEEDINGS-CALIFORNIA ACADEMY OF SCIENCES 55.26/35 (2004): 459.

Acteocinidae
Gastropods described in 1852
Molluscs of Mexico